The 23rd Online Film Critics Society Awards, honoring the best in film for 2019, were announced on January 6, 2020.

Winners and nominees
{| class="wikitable"
|-
! style="background:#EEDD82; width: 50%" | Best Picture
! style="background:#EEDD82; width: 50%" | Best Director
|-
| valign="top" |
 Parasite
 The Irishman
 Once Upon a Time...in Hollywood
 Marriage Story
 Knives Out
 Portrait of a Lady on Fire
 Us
 Uncut Gems
 1917
 Jojo Rabbit
| valign="top" |
 Bong Joon-ho – Parasite
 Sam Mendes – 1917
 Céline Sciamma – Portrait of a Lady on Fire
 Martin Scorsese  – The Irishman
 Quentin Tarantino – Once Upon a Time… in Hollywood
|-
! style="background:#EEDD82; width: 50%" | Best Actor
! style="background:#EEDD82; width: 50%" | Best Actress
|-
| valign="top" |
 Adam Driver – Marriage Story
 Antonio Banderas – Pain and Glory
 Robert De Niro – The Irishman
 Joaquin Phoenix – Joker
 Adam Sandler – Uncut Gems
| valign="top" |
 Lupita Nyong’o – Us
 Awkwafina – The Farewell
 Scarlett Johansson – Marriage Story
 Florence Pugh – Midsommar
 Renée Zellweger – Judy
|-
! style="background:#EEDD82; width: 50%" | Best Supporting Actor
! style="background:#EEDD82; width: 50%" | Best Supporting Actress
|-
| valign="top" |
 Brad Pitt – Once Upon a Time… in Hollywood
 Willem Dafoe – The Lighthouse
 Al Pacino – The Irishman
 Joe Pesci  – The Irishman
 Song Kang-ho – Parasite
| valign="top" |
 Jennifer Lopez – Hustlers
 Laura Dern – Marriage Story
 Florence Pugh – Little Women
 Margot Robbie – Once Upon a Time… in Hollywood
 Zhao Shu-zhen – The Farewell
|-
! style="background:#EEDD82; width: 50%" | Best Animated Feature
! style="background:#EEDD82; width: 50%" | Best Film Not in the English Language
|-
| valign="top" |
 Toy Story 4
 Frozen II
 How to Train Your Dragon: The Hidden World
 I Lost My Body
 Missing Link
| valign="top" |
 Parasite
 Atlantics
 Monos
 Pain and Glory
 Portrait of a Lady on Fire
|-
! style="background:#EEDD82; width: 50%" | Best Documentary
! style="background:#EEDD82; width: 50%" | Best Debut Feature
|-
| valign="top" |
 Apollo 11
 American Factory
 For Sama
 Honeyland
 One Child Nation
| valign="top" |
 Olivia Wilde – Booksmart
 Mati Diop – Atlantics
 Melina Matsoukas – Queen & Slim
 Tyler Nilson and Michael Schwartz – The Peanut Butter Falcon
 Joe Talbot – The Last Black Man in San Francisco
|-
! style="background:#EEDD82; width: 50%" | Best Original Screenplay
! style="background:#EEDD82; width: 50%" | Best Adapted Screenplay
|-
| valign="top" |
 Bong Joon-ho and Han Jin-won – Parasite
 Rian Johnson – Knives Out
 Noah Baumbach – Marriage Story
 Quentin Tarantino – Once Upon a Time...in Hollywood
 Jordan Peele – Us

| valign="top" |
 Steven Zaillian – The Irishman
 Micah Fitzerman-Blue and Noah Harpster – A Beautiful Day in the Neighborhood
 Lorene Scafaria – Hustlers
 Taika Waititi – Jojo Rabbit
 Greta Gerwig – Little Women
|-
! style="background:#EEDD82; width: 50%" | Best Editing
! style="background:#EEDD82; width: 50%" | Best Cinematography
|-
| valign="top" |
 Yang Jin-mo – Parasite
 Andrew Buckland and Michael McCusker – Ford v Ferrari
 Thelma Schoonmaker – The Irishman
 Lee Smith – 1917
 Fred Raskin – Once Upon a Time...in Hollywood
| valign="top" |
 Roger Deakins – 1917
 Rodrigo Prieto – The Irishman
 Jarin Blaschke – The Lighthouse
 Robert Richardson – Once Upon a Time...in Hollywood
 Claire Mathon – Portrait of a Lady on Fire
|-
! style="background:#EEDD82; width: 50%" | Best Original Score
! style="background:#EEDD82; width: 50%" | 
|-
| valign="top" |
 Michael Abels – Us
 Hildur Guðnadóttir – Joker
 Alexandre Desplat – Little Women
 Randy Newman – Marriage Story
 Thomas Newman – 1917
|}

Special awards

Technical Achievement Awards
 Ad Astra – Best Visual Effects John Wick: Chapter 3 – Parabellum – Best Stunt Coordination Knives Out – Best Acting Ensemble 1917 – Best Production Design Parasite – Best Production DesignLifetime Achievement Awards
 Julie Andrews Olivia de Havilland Roger Corman Martin Scorsese John WatersNon-U.S. ReleasesBacurau (Brazil)
Bait (United Kingdom)
Beanpole (Russia)
A Good Woman Is Hard to Find (United Kingdom)
A Rainy Day in New York (USA)
The Truth (France-Japan)
Vitalina Varela (Portugal)
The Whistlers (A European co-production)
Zombi Child (France)

Non-Theatrical Releases
Between Two Ferns: The Movie
The Body Remembers When the World Broke Open
El Camino: A Breaking Bad Movie
Homecoming: A Film by Beyoncé
Horror Noire: A History of Black Horror
Little Monsters
One Cut of the Dead
The Perfection
See You Yesterday
The Wind

Special Achievement Awards
 Agencia Nacional de Cinema (Brazil) for supporting art against the attacks from a fascist government.

References

2019 film awards
2019